Live: Deep in the Heart of Taxes is the 1983 live album by the New Zealand band DD Smash led by Dave Dobbyn. It was recorded live at Mainstreet on 29 July 1983. It reached number 11 on the New Zealand music charts.

Track listing
 Your Best Friend's A Moose	
 Solo		
 Devil You Know		
 Outlook For Thursday		
 Guilty		
 Itinerary		
 The Gambler

Awards
The album won best album at the 1983 New Zealand Music Awards. This was the second year in a row that the band had won the category, winning it in 1982 with Cool Bananas.

References

DD Smash albums
1983 live albums